Wu of Jin may refer to:

Marquis Wu of Jin ( 10th century BC?)
Duke Wu of Jin (died 677 BC)
Emperor Wu of Jin (266–290)